Celalettin Güvenç (born 1 January 1959) is a Turkish politician from the Justice and Development Party who has been a member of the Grand National Assembly of Turkey since 2015. He represents the electorate of Kahramanmaraş.

Personal life 
His younger brother Sıtkı Güvenç, who was MP for Kahramanmaraş from 2011 to 2015, died from his injuries sustained in the 2023 Turkey–Syria earthquake.

References

See also 

 26th Parliament of Turkey
 27th Parliament of Turkey

1959 births
Living people
Members of the 26th Parliament of Turkey
Members of the 27th Parliament of Turkey
Justice and Development Party (Turkey) politicians
People from Kahramanmaraş Province
21st-century Turkish politicians